The Henry James Review is a triannual peer-reviewed academic journal established in 1979 and is the official publication of the Henry James Society part of The Center for Henry James Studies at Creighton University. It is dedicated to the scholarly, critical, and theoretical study of the American writer Henry James. Each issue focuses on a specific theme of interest and seeks to promote understanding and study of James' contributions. The journal is published by the Johns Hopkins University Press and the current editor-in-chief is Greg W. Zacharias (Creighton University).

External links
 

Publications established in 1979
Triannual journals
Literary magazines published in the United States
English-language journals
Johns Hopkins University Press academic journals
James, Henry
1979 establishments in Nebraska